Kaspars Vecvagars (born 3 August 1993) is a former Latvian professional basketball player and currently an assistant coach for Valmiera Glass ViA.

Professional career
On 25 January 2023, Vecvagars signed a 5-week contract with Heroes Den Bosch, with an option for an extension. After his experience in Netherlands, Kaspars call it a day in his player career and immediately started coaching.

National team career 
Vecvagars has represented the Latvian national youth team in several competitions, including 2011 FIBA Under-19 World Championship. Vecvagars was a member of Latvia national team in EuroBasket 2015.

References

External links
 Kaspars Vecvagars at draftexpress.com
 Kaspars Vecvagars at eurobasket.com
 Kaspars Vecvagars at euroleague.net
 
 Kaspars Vecvagars at fiba.com

1993 births
Living people
Basketball players from Riga
Bàsquet Girona players
BC Lietkabelis players
BC Žalgiris players
BC Žalgiris-2 players
BK VEF Rīga players
Força Lleida CE players
Latvian men's basketball players
Point guards
Heroes Den Bosch players
Shooting guards